This article discusses beer in Central America.

Countries

Belize
Belikin is the leading domestically produced beer brand in Belize. It is a light continental European style lager. The Belize Brewing Company holds a monopoly in the market and also brews a few other lagers and a stout.

Costa Rica

The largest brewery in Costa Rica is the macrobrewery division of Florida Ice & Farm Co., known as Cervecería de Costa Rica, brewers of the Imperial, Pilsen, Bavaria, Rock Ice, Bohemia and Kaiser (non alcoholic) among other varieties and styles of the aforementioned beers. With the exception of Bavaria Dark, all are light-colored, light-bodied lagers.

Since 2010 a healthy craft beer industry has been growing year after year, as of 2015 more than 40 breweries exists in the country, and more than 100 different locally brewed beers are available.

El Salvador
The Salvadoran beers  are Pilsener Lager Bier (most prominent brand in the country), Golden Light, Regia "Extra" Lager and Suprema Premium Lager; all manufactured by Cervecevia La Constancia, a subsidiary of SABMiller. The only current competitor is Cadejo Brewing Company that its being the second major productor of craft beer, La Roja, La Negra, Guapa, La Mera Belga are manufactured by Cadejo Other international brands such as Heineken, Baltika or Corona are offered in the beer market, but also distributed (with lower sales) by the subsidiaries mentioned above.

Guatemala
The most famous beer is Gallo and its varieties Gallo Light and Chopp Gallo
among others like Victoria, Dorada Light, Dorada Draft, Montecarlo and Moza
all manufactured by Cervecería Centro Americana S.A. locally.

Since 2016, the craft beer scene in Guatemala began. Currently, there are more than a dozen craft breweries in the country. Some of these being: Cervecería 100Goles, Quiscalus Cerveza Artesanal, Xamán, Quetzal Brewing Company, Ixbalanque Cervecería, and various others.

Honduras
The big Honduran beers are Salva Vida, Imperial, Port Royal and Barena. All four are owned by the Cerveceria Hondureña, owner of the Coca-Cola brand and other drinks. Salva Vida is a lager, Imperial is a dark pilsner, Port Royal is pilsner and Barena is a light pilsner. In 2013 a microbrewery named D&D Brewing Co. began distributing beer in San Pedro Sula, the industrial hub of the country. 
In 2016 Gecko Brewing Co.(http://www.geckobrewingco.com/) was established in San Pedro Sula as the first craft brewery in this city focused on draft beer production and distribution to restaurants, bars and hotels.
Early 2019 Roatan Island Brewing Company  opened up on Roatan. Targeting both bars and restaurants on the island as well is open weekends for the public. Occasionally also hosts artisan markets.

Mexico

Nicaragua
Lagers: Toña and Premium. Pilsen: Victoria, Victoria Light and Victoria Frost. All manufactured by the Compañía Cervecera de Nicaragua.

Panama
Cerveza Panama, Soberana, Cristal, Cerveza Atlas and Balboa; all light body and pale lagers. Also manufactured under license locally other foreign marks how Heineken or Budweiser. see Beers of Panama for details.

References